The Biggest Loser UK 2005 was the first season of the reality television series entitled The Biggest Loser. The season first aired on 6 October 2005, with the final episode on 15 December 2005, where 12 overweight contestants competed for a cash prize of £25,000. Vicki Butler-Henderson was featured as the host, with trainers Angie Dowds and Mark Bailey. Aaron Howlett was named as the winner after losing .

Contestants

 Shane was traded from the Blue Team to the Red Team in Week 5 to re-balance the teams.

 Martin was brought back because Barny had to withdraw due to medical issues.

Final Prizes

Ratings
Episode Viewing figures from BARB

References

External links

UK
2005 British television seasons